W.A.K.O. World Championships 1987 were the sixth world kickboxing championships hosted by W.A.K.O. arranged by the German Karate pioneer Georg Brueckner and Carl Wiedmeier.  The event was open to amateur men and women, with 290 competitors from 29 countries taking part.  The styles on offer were Full-Contact (men only), Semi-Contact and Musical Forms (men only).  Typically, each country was allowed one competitor per weight division, although in some incidences more than one was allowed.  Participants were also allowed to compete in more than one style.  By the end of the championships, USA was the top of the medals tables, with hosts West Germany in second and Canada way behind in third.  The event was held at the Olympiahalle in Munich, Germany over two days (Saturday 10 October/Sunday 11 October) and were attended by an estimated 11,000 spectators.

Full-Contact

Full-Contact was available to men only at Munich and consisted of the usual ten weight divisions ranging from 54 kg/118.8 lbs to over 91 kg/+200.2 lbs.  All bouts were fought under Full-Contact kickboxing rules – more detail on the rules can be found at the W.A.K.O. website, although be aware that they may have changed slightly since 1987. There were some notable winners with future professional world champions Marek Piotrowski (kickboxing) and Troy Dorsey (boxing), Hungarian Olympic wrestling champ Norbert Növényi, and the ever present Ferdinand Mack picking up gold medals.  For Ferdinand Mack it would be his eight gold medal at a W.A.K.O. championships.  By the end of the championships the USA just about shaded hosts West Germany as the top nation in Full-Contact, with three golds, two silvers and one bronze.

Men's Full-Contact Kickboxing Medals Table

Semi-Contact

Both men and women took part in Semi-Contact competitions in Munich.  Semi-Contact differed from Full-Contact in that fights were won by points given due to technique, skill and speed, with physical force limited – more information on Semi-Contact can be found on the W.A.K.O. website, although the rules will have changed since 1987. At Munich the men had seven weight classes, starting at 57 kg/125.4 lbs and ending at over 84 kg/+184.8 lbs, while the women's competition had four weight classes beginning at 50 kg/110 lbs and ending at over 60 kg/132 lbs.  There were a few notable winners in the men's events with Mike Anderson winning gold and American teammate and future pro-boxing world champion Troy Dorsey picking up silver (both had won gold in the Full-Contact category at the same games).  By the end of the championships, USA were the top nation in Semi-Contact with five golds, one silver and one bronze (male and female combined).

Men's Semi-Contact Kickboxing Medals Table

Women's Semi-Contact Kickboxing Medals Table

Musical Forms

Musical Forms returned to a W.A.K.O. championships having been absent at the European championships in Athens.  The event was for men only but unlike the previous appearances in London and Milan there were now more categories; with hard styles, soft styles and weapons introduced.  Musical Forms is a non-physical competition which sees the contestants fighting against imaginary foes using Martial Arts techniques – more information can be accessed on the W.A.K.O. website, although be aware that the rules may have changed since 1987. By the end of the championships, the USA were the top nation in Musical Forms, winning two gold and one silver medal.

Men's Musical Forms Medals Table

Overall Medals Standing (Top 5)

See also
List of WAKO Amateur World Championships
List of WAKO Amateur European Championships

References

External links
 WAKO World Association of Kickboxing Organizations Official Site

WAKO Amateur World Championships events
Kickboxing in Germany
1987 in kickboxing
Sports competitions in Munich
1987 in West German sport
1980s in Munich
October 1987 sports events in Europe